Peter Allen (c. 1855 – 22 October 1925) was an Australian politician. He was a farmer and a correspondent for the Adelaide Advertiser before entering politics. He was a member of the South Australian House of Assembly, representing Wallaroo from 1902 to 1912 and Yorke Peninsula from 1915 to 1925 as a representative of the Farmers and Producers Political Union, the Liberal Union and Liberal Federation. He contested the 1891 Wallaroo by-election.

Prior to entering state politics, he was chairman of the District Council of Green's Plains, and was the first chairman of the District Council of Kadina from 1888 to 1891.

References

Year of birth uncertain
1850s births
1925 deaths
Members of the South Australian House of Assembly
Politicians from Adelaide
Australian journalists
Place of birth missing